James Mountford was a 19th-century footballer who played for Port Vale in the early 1890s.

Career
Mountford joined Port Vale in August 1892. On 22 October 1892, he made his debut at Lincoln City and scored one of the goals in a 4–3 victory. Despite this apparent success he was never selected again and was released from the Athletic Ground at the end of the 1892–93 season.

Career statistics
Source:

References

Year of birth missing
Year of death missing
English footballers
Association football wingers
Port Vale F.C. players
English Football League players